Kolyo Zakhariev (born 5 July 1968) is a Bulgarian sports shooter. He competed in two events at the 1996 Summer Olympics.

References

1968 births
Living people
Bulgarian male sport shooters
Olympic shooters of Bulgaria
Shooters at the 1996 Summer Olympics
Sportspeople from Sofia